Hans Blom may refer to:

Hans Jensen Blom (1812–1875), Norwegian politician and clergyman
 (born 1943), Dutch historian, former director of the NIOD
Hans Blom (philosopher) (born 1947), Dutch philosopher, Grotius expert